South Hills can refer to several places including:

South Africa
 South Hills, Gauteng, a city

United States
 South Hills (California), a small mountain range in eastern Los Angeles County, California, United States
 South Hills, Kentucky, since annexed by nearby Fort Wright
 South Hills (Montana) a neighborhood in the city of Missoula.
 South Hills (Pennsylvania), the collective name for the southern suburbs of Pittsburgh, Pennsylvania, United States
South Hills Village, a neighborhood
 South Hills Mall, a former indoor shopping mall soon to become an outdoor strip center in the town of Poughkeepsie, New York, United States

See also
 South Hills High School (disambiguation)
 Southern Hills (disambiguation)